Song of Songs 1 (abbreviated  as Song 1) is the first chapter of a book called "Song of Songs" or "Song of Solomon" in the Hebrew Bible or the Old Testament of the Christian Bible. This book is one of the Five Megillot, a collection of short books, together with Ruth, Lamentations, Ecclesiastes and Esther, within the Ketuvim, the third and the last part of the Hebrew Bible. Jewish tradition views Solomon as the author of this book (although this is now largely disputed), and this attribution influences the acceptance of this book as a canonical text. This chapter contains the superscription, songs of the main female characters and the opening song of the male character.

Text
 
The original text is written in Hebrew language. This chapter is divided into 17 verses (16 verses in the Latin Vulgate translation).

Textual witnesses

Some early manuscripts containing the text of this chapter in Hebrew are of the Masoretic Text, which includes the Aleppo Codex (10th century), and Codex Leningradensis (1008). Some fragments containing parts of this chapter were found among the Dead Sea Scrolls, assigned as 6Q6 (6QCant); 50 CE; extant verses 1–7).

There is also a translation into Koine Greek known as the Septuagint, made in the last few centuries BCE. Extant ancient manuscripts of the Septuagint version include Codex Vaticanus (B; B; 4th century), Codex Sinaiticus (S; BHK: S; 4th century), and Codex Alexandrinus (A; A; 5th century).

Structure
The Modern English Version (MEV) divides this chapter as follows:
 = Introduction
a = The Woman
b = Friends of the Woman
 = The Woman
 = Friends of the Woman
 = The Man
 = Friends of the Woman
 = The Woman
 = The Man
 = The Woman

The New Catholic Bible and Jerusalem Bible treat verses 2-4 as a "prologue". Richard Hess, on the other hand, treats verses 1:1-2:7 as a "prologue".

Superscription (1:1)

A superscription in a biblical book functions like the title page of a modern book, containing information about the genre, author, and sometimes also the subject matter and the date of the book (in prophecy books for examples, Isaiah 1:1; Nahum 1:1;; Ecclesiastes 1:1).

Verse 1
 The song of songs, which is Solomon's.
This verse is a detached description of the book's content, containing two phrases: "the song of songs" and "which is Solomon's".
The "song of songs" (ha-): The form of the words indicates a superlative statement as the "Best Song", but can also denote "a single poem composed of many poems".
"Song" (Hebrew: , ; also meaning "poem") in noun form appears only here in this book, out of 166 times in the Hebrew Bible (mostly in the Book of Psalms).
"Which is Solomon's" ("that concerns Solomon"; Hebrew: ,  li): can have the interpretation that (1) Solomon is the author; (2) the book is dedicated to Solomon; or (3) it was merely a 'part of royal holding'.

Female: Longing for her lover (1:2–7)

This section is the first part of the Prologue, as described by Hess, containing the description of the lovers' first coming together and intimacy (1:2–2:7). The speaker is a woman as definitely established in verse 5 from the adjectival form shehora ("black").

Verses 2–4 contains a 'romantic soliloquy' of a woman about her lover, with two distinctive word-patterns: "your_love (or 'lovemaking') more_than_wine" (verses 2, 4; Hebrew: ,  mî-) and "they love you" (verses 3, 4; Hebrew:).

The first appearance of the first word-pattern is a part of a chiastic structure (verses 2b–3a):
A. good
B. your lovemaking
 C. wine
 C'. scent
B'. ointments
A'. good
The second chiastic structure of the same word-pattern could be found in verse 4(c–d). The word for the noun "love" is plural, indicating more that one romantic act, so here "lovemaking" is a better rendering than a simple word "love".

One Hebrew word (ahebuka) becomes the second word-pattern "[they] love you" which is used 'twice as the last word of a tricolon' in verses 3 and 4. The root verb "love" is used seven times in the whole book (verses 1:3, 4, 7; 3:1, 2, 3, 4) and always translated in Greek using the same verb 'agapaō' in Septuagint (LXX) (also only seven times in these seven verses of the book).

Verse 3
[The Shulamite]
Because of the fragrance of your good ointments,
Your name is ointment poured forth;
Therefore the virgins love you.

"The virgins" (Hebrew:): from the root word ‘ălmā ("maiden"), which is only used seven times in the whole Hebrew Bible, twice in this book (the second one in ), none denies the possibility of the interpretation of "virgins", some even suggest it, but the most certain meaning is "unmarried women who are, or shortly will be, sexually mature".

Verse 4

According to the New King James Version (NKJV)
[The Shulamite]
Draw me away!
[The Daughters of Jerusalem]
We will run after you.
[The Shulamite]
The king has brought me into his chambers.
[The Daughters of Jerusalem]
We will be glad and rejoice in you.
We will remember your love more than wine.
[The Shulamite]
Rightly do they love you.

"You": masculine singular, referring to "the Beloved" ("the man").
"You": feminine singular, referring to "the Shulamite" ("the woman").

Verse 5
I am black, but comely, O ye daughters of Jerusalem, as the tents of Kedar, as the curtains of Solomon.

The phrase "daughters of Jerusalem" ("friends of the woman" in MEV heading; "girls of Jerusalem" in Living Bible) is introduced as one of the three identifiable speaking voices and principal characters in this chapter, other than the woman, who speaks until verse 7, and the man, whom the woman talks about in 1:2-4 and 7 (he starts to speak in 1:9-11).

Verse 6
Do not gaze at me, because I am dark,
because the sun has looked upon me.
My mother's sons were angry with me;
they made me the keeper of the vineyards,
but my own vineyard I have not kept.
"My mother's sons": suggesting her "full brothers" (not "half-brothers"), who seem to assume responsibility for the woman (cf. ), a common practice in patriarchal societies, especially with no mention of her father in the whole book.

Verse 7

Tell me, you whom my soul loves,
where you pasture your flock,
where you make it lie down at noon;
for why should I be like one who wanders
beside the flocks of your companions?
"Noon": in warm climates, such as in Palestine, is a time for 'rest and repose', and a convenient occasion for 'an amorous tryst'.

Male: Response with invitation and praise (1:8–11)
Hess notes the distinct structure of the verses containing the male's response in term of the syllable count for the lines in each one:
 Verse 8: 11, 6, and 12
 Verse 9: 7 and 6
 Verse 10: 8 and 6
 Verse 11: 7 and 6
It is clear that verse 8 is structurally out of sequence among these verses and different in the content as well: verse 8 provides the answer to the female's prior question, whereas verses 9–11 focus on her beauty.

Verse 8
[He]
If you do not know,
O most beautiful among women,
follow in the tracks of the flock,
and pasture your young goats
beside the shepherds' tents.
All three finite verbs in this verse ("know", "follow" and "pasture") have the woman as the subject, and the second-person feminine singular form is used for "you" or "your". The structure of this verse duplicates the woman's question and plea of verse 7. MEV applies this verse to the "Friends of the woman".

Verse 9
[The Man]
I compare you, my love, to a mare among Pharaoh’s chariots.
The masculine form of the same root word to call the man ("my [male] friend"; Hebrew:) is used in a parallel construction with "my beloved" (Hebrew:) in Song 5:16.

Female: Her lover as fragrance (1:12–14)

In these three verses, the woman describes her lover in the first line and their relationship in the second line. The second word in each of the verses—the king, the myrrh, the henna—are the only words preceded by the definite article  (ha) in this section, indicating their identification with one another.

Verse 12
While the king is at his table,
My spikenard sends forth its fragrance.
"His table" (Hebrew:): with a meaning "that which surrounds or is round", likely "a divan or seat set round a room".
"Spikenard" (or "nard";): or "perfume"; a substance originated from India, extracted from Nardostachys jatamansi, a plant of the family Valerianaceae, growing in the Himalaya mountains, in Nepal and Bhutan. It was "very precious" as read from the account of Mary's anointing on Jesus, priced more than 300 denarii.

Verse 14

My beloved is unto me as a cluster of camphire in the vineyards of Engedi.
"Camphire" (Hebrew:) or "Henna" (Lawsonia inermis) from Arabic:  (ALA-LC: ḥinnāʾ). This small shrub (8–10 feet high) produces "clusters of white and yellow blossoms with a powerful fragrance" and continues to grow in En-gedi area from the ancient time until the modern era, providing an enduring illustration of this verse.
Engedi: lit. "spring of the kid"; an "oasis on the western shore of the Dead Sea".

Male: Praise of beauty (1:15)

Verse 15
Behold, you are fair, my love!
Behold, you are fair!
You have dove's eyes.
In this verse and the following, the lovers exchange a mutual admiration in a parallel fashion:
first the man (verse 15)
a. Ah!
b. you are beautiful
c. my love
then the woman (verse 16):
a'. Ah!
b'. you are beautiful
c'. my love

The response of the man comprises seven words, two of which are repeated (Hebrew:   , "behold_you_[are] fair").

Female: Love in paradise (1:16–2:1)
Verses 16–17 focus on the subject of trees, with a closure in verse 2:1 on the subject of flowers, to provide a 'picture of the bed as a spreading growth', using a theme of nature's flora.

See also
 Engedi (Ein Gedi)
 Jerusalem
 Jezreel

Notes

References

Sources

External links
 Jewish translations:
 Shir Hashirim - Song of Songs - Chapter 1 (Judaica Press) translation [with Rashi's commentary] at Chabad.org
 Christian translations:
 Online Bible at GospelHall.org (ESV, KJV, Darby, American Standard Version, Bible in Basic English)
 Song of Solomon Chapter 1 King James Version
  Various versions

01